Družinska Vas is a village on the left bank of the Krka River in the Municipality of Šmarješke Toplice in southeastern Slovenia. The area is part of the historical region of Lower Carniola. The municipality is now included in the Southeast Slovenia Statistical Region.

Name
Družinska Vas was attested in historical sources as Droschendorf in 1386 and Drosindorf in 1483. The name is derived from the nickname *Druganъ, presumably referring to an early inhabitant of the village, and therefore means 'Druganъ's village'.

References

External links
Družinska Vas at Geopedia

Populated places in the Municipality of Šmarješke Toplice